Valérian Sauveplane (born 25 July 1980) is a French sport shooter.

He was born in Montpellier, France.  He competed for France in the 2008 Summer Olympics and 2012 Summer Olympics.  He shares the world record in the 50 meter rifle prone competition.

Current world record in 50 m rifle prone

References

External links

1980 births
Living people
French male sport shooters
Olympic shooters of France
Shooters at the 2008 Summer Olympics
Shooters at the 2012 Summer Olympics
Shooters at the 2016 Summer Olympics
Sportspeople from Montpellier
Shooters at the 2015 European Games
European Games gold medalists for France
European Games medalists in shooting
ISSF rifle shooters
Mediterranean Games gold medalists for France
Mediterranean Games silver medalists for France
Mediterranean Games medalists in shooting
Competitors at the 2013 Mediterranean Games
20th-century French people
21st-century French people